Tender Moments is the eighth album by jazz pianist McCoy Tyner and his second released on the Blue Note label. It was recorded in December 1967 and features performances by Tyner with an expanded group featuring trumpeter Lee Morgan, trombonist Julian Priester, French horn player Bob Northern, tuba player Howard Johnson, alto saxophonist James Spaulding, tenor saxophonist Bennie Maupin, bassist Herbie Lewis and drummer Joe Chambers.

Reception
The Allmusic review by Scott Yanow states that "the music is quite colorful and advanced for the period. Well worth investigating".

Track listing
 "Mode to John" - 5:42
 "Man from Tanganyika" - 6:54
 "The High Priest" - 6:08
 "Utopia" - 7:37
 "All My Yesterdays" - 6:04
 "Lee Plus Three" - 5:35
All compositions by McCoy Tyner

Personnel
McCoy Tyner - piano
Lee Morgan - trumpet
Herbie Lewis - bass
Joe Chambers - drums
Julian Priester - trombone (except “Lee Plus Three”)
Bob Northern - french horn (except “Lee Plus Three”)
Howard Johnson - tuba (except “Lee Plus Three”)
James Spaulding - alto saxophone, flute (except “Lee Plus Three”)
Bennie Maupin - tenor saxophone (except “Lee Plus Three”)

References

1968 albums
Blue Note Records albums
Post-bop albums
McCoy Tyner albums
Albums produced by Francis Wolff
Albums recorded at Van Gelder Studio